The Death of General Mercer at the Battle of Princeton, January 3, 1777 is the title of an oil painting by the American artist John Trumbull depicting the death of the American General Hugh Mercer at the Battle of Princeton on Friday, January 3, 1777, during the American Revolutionary War. The painting was Trumbull’s first depiction of an American victory. It is one of a series of historical paintings on the war, which also includes the Declaration of Independence and The Capture of the Hessians at Trenton, December 26, 1776.

The artist expressed his great admiration for General George Washington in this painting as he wrote in the catalogue for his exhibited works at Yale University in 1835:

It was a personal favorite of Trumbull himself. When asked by Benjamin Silliman which paintings he would save from destruction in the Trumbull Gallery at Yale, he said this one.

Trumbull used the General's son, Hugh Jr., as a model for the painting.

Description
The picture displays several different events of the battle as if they occurred simultaneously.

At the center, American General Hugh Mercer, with his dead horse beneath him, is shown mortally wounded. Mercer was commanding the leading division of the Continental Army when attacked by British Colonel Charles Mawhood near Princeton, New Jersey. Mercer's horse was killed and he was attacked by two grenadiers. The British were in control of the battle at this moment. Mercer would be treated for his wounds by Dr. Benjamin Rush the next day, January 4, but died on January 12 as a result, Dr. Rush believed, of a concussion caused by a musket butt to the head

At the left, American Daniel Neil is shown bayoneted against his cannon. Capt. Daniel Neil was the Captain of Artillery and began his service in the Revolutionary War as Captain-Lieutenant in the East New Jersey Artillery in Knox's Battalion March 1st, 1776. He was appointed Capt on May, 9th 1776. Captain Neil died on the battlefield by an excessive number of saber wounds by the British.

At the right, British Captain William Leslie is shown mortally wounded. Leslie died during the battle and was put on a wagon by the British that was later taken by the Americans. Rush also learned of his death on January 4. He would be buried at Pluckemin, New Jersey the next day, January 5.

In the background, American General George Washington and Dr. Benjamin Rush enter the scene. After Mercer became a casualty, Washington needed to lead the charge to overtake Mawhood's troops and win the battle. On the far left, American General Thomas Mifflin is shown leading a cavalry charge. American Colonel John Cadwalader and British Colonel Edmund Eyre are also depicted.

Other versions
Trumbull worked on this painting for many years and created several sketches and final oil paintings. A collection of sketches is located at the Princeton University Library.

A large scale version ( x ), painted in 1831, is owned by the Wadsworth Atheneum in Hartford, Connecticut.

The Yale University Art Gallery also owns an unfinished version titled The Death of General Mercer at the Battle of Princeton, 3 January 1777 and dated –.

Gallery

See also
 Battle of Trenton

Notes

References

External links

 
  Owner: Yale University Art Gallery
 

Paintings by John Trumbull
Paintings about the American Revolution
War paintings
1787 paintings
New Jersey in the American Revolution
Paintings in the Yale University Art Gallery
Flags in art
Equestrian portraits
Musical instruments in art
George Washington in art
Cultural depictions of American men
Cultural depictions of military officers